Portugal men's national hockey team may refer to:

 Portugal men's national field hockey team
 Portugal men's national ice hockey team
 Portugal national roller hockey team